The Searle Scholars Program is a career development award made annually to the 15 young US professionals in biomedical research and chemistry considered most promising. The award was established in 1980 by a donation from the Searle family, and is operated by the Chicago Community Trust.

The award supports "research in medicine, chemistry, and the biological sciences" with grants to academic institutions supporting the faculty in their first or second year of their first tenure-track assistant professor position.  The award recognizes faculty who have made "important, innovative research" contributions and who have the potential for making continuing significant contributions.

15 awards are made per year. As of April 11, 2007, 438 Searle Scholars had been selected. Notable recipients have included:

Recipients

1981 

 Dale L. Boger, University of Kansas
 Walter F. Boron, Yale University
 G. Charles Dismukes, Princeton University
 Elaine V. Fuchs, The University of Chicago
 Stanley M. Goldin, Harvard University and Harvard School of Public Health
 Leroy F. Liu, The Johns Hopkins University
 James E. Niedel, Duke University
 Harry T. Orr, Professor of Pathology University of Minnesota
 Daniel K. Podolsky, Harvard University and Harvard School of Public Health
 Lee L. Rubin, The Rockefeller University
 Wesley J. Thompson, The University of Texas at Austin
 Chun-Fang Wu, University of Iowa

1982 

 David A. Agard, University of California, San Francisco
 George Barany, University of Minnesota
 Albert H. Beth, Vanderbilt University
 Kurt Drickamer, The University of Chicago
 Alan L. Epstein, Northwestern University
 Larry R. Gerace, The Johns Hopkins University
 Stephen P. Goff, Higgins Professor of Biochemistry & Molecular Biophysics, Columbia University
 Ralph J. Greenspan, Princeton University
 Mark E. Gurney, The University of Chicago
 Russel E. Kaufman, Duke University
 Daniel F. Klessig, University of Utah
 Burks Oakley II, University of Illinois at Urbana Champaign
 Peter Parham, Stanford University
 Jordan S. Pober, Harvard University and Harvard School of Public Health
 Stuart L. Schreiber, Yale University
 Suresh Subramani, University of California, San Diego

1983 

 Frederick Alt, Columbia University
 Gary W. Brudvig, Yale University
 Peter M. J. Burgers, Washington University
 Michele P. Calos, Stanford University
 Robert B. Clark, University of Connecticut
 Daniel J. Donoghue, University of California, San Diego
 Richard W. Gross, Washington University
 Alfred J. Lewy, Oregon Health & Science University
 Douglas A. Melton, Harvard University and Harvard School of Public Health
 Hylan C. Moises, University of Michigan Medical School
 Richard C. Mulligan, Massachusetts Institute of Technology
 Daniel F. Schafer, University of Nebraska
 Paul C. Sternweis, University of Texas Southwestern Medical Center
 Kevin Struhl, Harvard University and Harvard School of Public Health
 Roger Y. Tsien, University of California, Berkeley
 Margaret R. Wallace, University of Florida
 Peter Walter, University of California, San Francisco
 Nancy L. Weigel, Baylor College of Medicine
 Stuart K. Williams, Thomas Jefferson University
 Barbara J. Wold, California Institute of Technology

1984 

 Richard W. Aldrich, Yale University
 Steven A. Benner, Harvard University and Harvard School of Public Health
 Carlos J. Bustamante, University of New Mexico
 Thomas F. Donahue, Northwestern University
 Susan K. Dutcher, University of Colorado
 Scott D. Emr, California Institute of Technology
 Stephen L. Gluck, The University of Chicago
 R. Scott Hawley, Albert Einstein College of Medicine
 Paul B. Hopkins, University of Washington
 Michele Jungery, Harvard University and Harvard School of Public Health
 Michael Karin, University of Southern California
 Brian G. Van Ness, University of Iowa
 Vincent R. Racaniello, Columbia University
 Douglas C. Rees, University of California, Los Angeles
 Pate Skene, Stanford University
 Tom H. Stevens, University of Oregon
 Dennis K. Stone, University of Texas Southwestern Medical Center
 Thomas D. Tullius, The Johns Hopkins University
 Edgar T. Walters, University of Texas Health Science Center at Houston
 Jean Y.J. Wang, University of California, San Diego

1985 

 Daniel J. Chin, University of California, San Francisco
 John W. Frost, Stanford University
 Margaret T. Fuller, University of Colorado
 James F. Gusella, Harvard University and Harvard School of Public Health
 Adrian C. Hayday, Yale University
 Raphael C. Lee, Massachusetts Institute of Technology
 Michael S. Levine, Columbia University
 Daniel I. H. Linzer, Northwestern University
 William J. McGinnis, Yale University
 Edward G. Moczydlowski, University of Cincinnati Medical Center
 John W. Newport, University of California, San Diego
 Arthur Pardi, Rutgers, The State University of New Jersey
 Richard C. Parker, Columbia University
 Peter G. Schultz, University of California, Berkeley
 Matthew P. Scott University of Colorado
 Joseph S. Takahashi, Northwestern University
 Lex H. T. Van der Ploeg, Columbia University
 Barbara T. Wakimoto, University of Washington
 Jonathan Widom, University of Illinois at Urbana Champaign
 Chi-Huey Wong, Texas A&M University

1986 

 William H. Armstrong, University of California, Berkeley
 Jef D. Boeke, The Johns Hopkins University
 Constance L. Cepko, Harvard University and Harvard School of Public Health
 Judith S. Eisen, University of Oregon
 Kenneth S. Feldman, The Pennsylvania State University
 Michael R. Green, Harvard University and Harvard School of Public Health
 Jonathan G. Izant, Yale University
 Michael Kahn, University of Illinois at Chicago
 Cynthia J. Kenyon, University of California, San Francisco
 Kevin L. Kirk, University of Alabama at Birmingham
 John A. Leigh, University of Washington
 Dan R. Littman, University of California, San Francisco
 Vincent L. Pecoraro, University of Michigan Medical School
 Garabed G. Sahagian, Tufts University
 Molly Schmid, Princeton University
 Sara E. Via, University of Iowa
 Michael P. Yaffe, University of California, San Diego
 Kenneth S. Zaret, Brown University

1987 

 David J. Anderson, California Institute of Technology
 Jeremy M. Berg, The Johns Hopkins University
 Brent H. Cochran, Massachusetts Institute of Technology
 James W. Golden, Texas A&M University
 Michael E. Greenberg, Harvard University and Harvard School of Public Health
 Iva S. Greenwald, Princeton University
 Diana K. Hawley, University of Oregon
 Ralph R. Isberg, Tufts University
 Reid C. Johnson, University of California, Los Angeles
 Karla A. Kirkegaard, University of Colorado
 David M. Kranz, University of Illinois at Urbana Champaign
 Robert C. Landick, Washington University
 Mark A. Lehrman, University of Texas Southwestern Medical Center
 Daniel Margoliash, The University of Chicago
 Kelly E. Mayo, Northwestern University
 Richard M. Myers, University of California, San Francisco
 Thomas V. O'Halloran, Northwestern University
 Ronald D. Vale, University of California, San Francisco

1988 

 Allan Bradley, Baylor College of Medicine
 Vicki L. Chandler, University of Oregon
 Fred E. Cohen, University of California, San Francisco
 Trisha N. Davis, University of Washington
 Samuel H. Gellman, University of Wisconsin - Madison
 Howard D. Lipshitz, California Institute of Technology
 Terry P. Lybrand, University of Minnesota
 Sabeeha Merchant, University of California, Los Angeles
 Terry L. Orr-Weaver, Massachusetts Institute of Technology
 David M. Shore, Columbia University
 Steven O. Smith, Yale University
 Hermann Steller, Massachusetts Institute of Technology
 Paul W. Sternberg, California Institute of Technology
 James H. Thomas, University of Washington
 Gerald S. Wilkinson, University of Maryland, Medical School

1989 

 Rene Bernards, Harvard University and Harvard School of Public Health
 David W. Christianson, University of Pennsylvania
 Richard H. Ebright, Rutgers, The State University of New Jersey
 Daniel E. Kahne, Princeton University
 William H. Kane, Duke University
 Manfred J. Lohka, University of Colorado
 Susan K. McConnell, Stanford University
 Aaron P. Mitchell, Columbia University
 Timothy J. Mitchison, University of California, San Francisco
 Gaetano T. Montelione, Rutgers, The State University of New Jersey
 Keith E. Mostov, University of California, San Francisco
 Alexandra C. Newton, Indiana University
 David C. Page, Massachusetts Institute of Technology
 Ron M. Prywes, Columbia University
 Scott D. Rychnovsky, University of Minnesota
 John C. Schimenti, Case Western Reserve University
 Wesley C. Van Voorhis, University of Washington

1990 

 Jean S. Baum, Rutgers, The State University of New Jersey
 Mark D. Biggin, Yale University
 David Alan Brow, University of Wisconsin - Madison
 Kenneth C. Burtis, University of California, Davis
 Chris Q. Doe, University of Illinois at Urbana Champaign
 David G. Drubin, University of California, Berkeley
 Jeff Gelles, Brandeis University
 Joseph Holoshitz, University of Michigan Medical School
 Stuart K. Kim, Stanford University
 David Kimelman, University of Washington
 Gilles J. Laurent, California Institute of Technology
 Peter Lobel, University of Medicine & Dentistry of New Jersey
 David O. Morgan, University of California, San Francisco
 Roy R. Parker, University of Arizona
 Ernest G. Peralta, Harvard University and Harvard School of Public Health
 Ronald T. Raines, University of Wisconsin - Madison
 Trina A. Schroer, The Johns Hopkins University
 Gregory L. Verdine, Harvard University and Harvard School of Public Health

1991 

 Eric V. Anslyn, The University of Texas at Austin
 Albert J. Courey, University of California, Los Angeles
 Todd R. Evans, University of Pittsburgh
 Gregory K. Farber, The Pennsylvania State University
 James E. Ferrell, University of Wisconsin - Madison
 Alan D. Friedman, The Johns Hopkins University
 Jorge E. Galan, Stony Brook University
 M. Reza Ghadiri, Scripps Research Institute
 Ann Hochschild, Harvard University and Harvard School of Public Health
 Brent L. Iverson, The University of Texas at Austin
 Jeffrey W. Kelly, Texas A&M University
 Richard S. Mann, Columbia University
 Cornelis Murre, University of California, San Diego
 Tamar Schlick, New York University
 Marc Tessier-Lavigne, University of California, San Francisco
 Michael Therien, University of Pennsylvania
 James R. Williamson, Massachusetts Institute of Technology
 Astar Winoto, University of California, Berkeley

1992 

 Cornelia I. Bargmann, University of California, San Francisco
 Warren F. Beck, Vanderbilt University
 Alan D. Bender, Indiana University
 Christopher C. Goodnow, Stanford University
 Kathleen L. Gould, Vanderbilt University
 Mark W. Hochstrasser, The University of Chicago
 Chris A. Kaiser, Massachusetts Institute of Technology
 Elizabeth A. Komives, University of California, San Diego
 Mitzi I. Kuroda, Baylor College of Medicine
 Yang Liu, New York University
 Mark Peifer, University of North Carolina
 B. Franklin Pugh, The Pennsylvania State University
 Joel H. Rothman, University of Wisconsin - Madison
 Alan B. Sachs, University of California, Berkeley
 Hazel L. Sive, Massachusetts Institute of Technology
 William B. Tolman, University of Minnesota
 Thomas F. Vogt, Princeton University

1993 

 Natalie G. Ahn, University of Colorado
 David T. Burke, University of Michigan Medical School
 Allison J. Doupe, University of California, San Francisco
 Min Han, University of Colorado
 Lizbeth K. Hedstrom, Brandeis University
 Daniel Herschlag, Stanford University
 Tyler Jacks, Massachusetts Institute of Technology
 Gregg B. Morin, University of California, Davis
 Anna Marie Pyle, Columbia University
 Alexander Y. Rudensky, University of Washington
 Michael A. Simon, Stanford University
 Mark J. Solomon, Yale University
 Sriram Subramaniam, The Johns Hopkins University
 Wesley I. Sundquist, University of Utah
 Jonathan V. Sweedler, University of Illinois at Urbana Champaign

1994 

 Ben A. Barres, Stanford University
 Lorena S. Beese, Duke University
 John S. Chant, Harvard University and Harvard School of Public Health
 Kathleen R. Foltz, University of California, Santa Barbara
 Brian G. Fox, University of Wisconsin - Madison
 Xiang-Dong Fu, University of California, San Diego
 J. Eric Gouaux, The University of Chicago
 Kay E. Holekamp, Michigan State University
 Richard A. Lang, New York University
 Daniel J. Leahy, The Johns Hopkins University
 Jun Liu, Massachusetts Institute of Technology
 Shawn R. Lockery, University of Oregon
 Lawrence S. Mathews, University of Michigan Medical School
 Stephen L. Mayo, California Institute of Technology
 Kenneth Miller, University of California, San Francisco
 Melissa J. Moore, Brandeis University
 Arthur G. Palmer, Columbia University

1995 

 Nancy L. Allbritton, University of California, Irvine
 T. Keith Blackwell, Harvard University and Harvard School of Public Health
 David S. Bredt, University of California, San Francisco
 David D. Chang, University of California, Los Angeles
 Raymond J. Deshaies, California Institute of Technology
 Paul A. DiMilla, Carnegie Mellon University
 Ali Hemmati-Brivanlou, The Rockefeller University
 Michael P. Hendrich, Carnegie Mellon University
 Frederick M. Hughson, Princeton University
 Adam Kuspa, Baylor College of Medicine
 Daniel J. Lew, Duke University
 Joachim J. Li, University of California, San Francisco
 Michael L. Nonet, Washington University
 Yeon-Kyun Shin, University of California, Berkeley
 Peter K. Sorger, Massachusetts Institute of Technology
 Timothy P. Stearns, Stanford University

1996 

 Kavita Arora, University of California, Irvine
 Stephen Bell, Massachusetts Institute of Technology
 J. Martin Bollinger, Jr., The Pennsylvania State University
 Kyle W. Cunningham, The Johns Hopkins University
 Jennifer A. Doudna, Yale University
 James W. Erickson, Columbia University
 Alex L. Kolodkin, The Johns Hopkins University
 Barbara N. Kunkel, Washington University
 Peter Mombaerts, The Rockefeller University
 Mary Shannon Moore, Baylor College of Medicine
 Milan Mrksich, The University of Chicago
 Piali Sengupta, Brandeis University
 Alice Telesnitsky, University of Michigan Medical School
 Anne M. Villeneuve, Stanford University
 Chyung-Ru Wang, The University of Chicago

1997 

 David P. Bartel, Massachusetts Institute of Technology
 Judith L. Bender, The Johns Hopkins University
 Kendal S. Broadie, University of Utah
 Robert C. Dunn, University of Kansas
 Randolph Y. Hampton, University of California, San Diego
 Bruce A. Hay, California Institute of Technology
 Kristin A. Hogquist, University of Minnesota
 Wendell A. Lim, University of California, San Francisco
 Daphne K. Preuss, The University of Chicago
 Tito A. Serafini, University of California, Berkeley
 Geraldine C. Seydoux, The Johns Hopkins University
 Ben Shen, University of California, Davis
 Kevan M. Shokat, Princeton University
 Scott A. Strobel, Yale University
 Jonathan S. Weissman, University of California, San Francisco

1998 

 Zhijian James Chen, University of Texas Southwestern Medical Center
 Benjamin F. Cravatt, Scripps Research Institute
 Catherine G. Dulac, Harvard University and Harvard School of Public Health
 Ueli Grossniklaus, Cold Spring Harbor Laboratory
 Anne C. Hart, Harvard University Medical School
 Linda A. Hicke, Northwestern University
 Christopher J. Lee, University of California, Los Angeles
 Krishna K. Niyogi, University of California, Berkeley
 Evgeny A. Nudler, New York University
 Kit J. Pogliano, University of California, San Diego
 Renee A. Reijo Pera, University of California, San Francisco
 Michael F. Rexach, Stanford University
 Jason B. Shear, The University of Texas at Austin
 William C. Skarnes, University of California, Berkeley
 Kevin M. Weeks, University of North Carolina

1999 

 Carrolee Barlow, Salk Institute for Biological Studies
 Brendan P. Cormack, The Johns Hopkins University
 Kevin H. Gardner, University of Texas Southwestern Medical Center
 Rachel D. Green, The Johns Hopkins University
 Phyllis I. Hanson, Washington University
 Pehr A. B. Harbury, Stanford University
 Jin Jiang, University of Texas Southwestern Medical Center
 Ka Yee C. Lee, The University of Chicago
 Karolin Luger, Colorado State University
 William W. Metcalf, University of Illinois at Urbana Champaign
 Dale A. Ramsden, University of North Carolina
 Pamela Schwartzberg, National Institutes of Health
 Yigong Shi, Princeton University
 Frederic E. Theunissen, University of California, Berkeley
 Ding Xue, University of Colorado

2000 

 James H. Doudna Cate, Massachusetts Institute of Technology
 Greg DeAngelis, Washington University 
 Joseph Gleeson, University of California, San Diego
 Oliver Hobert, Columbia University
 Eric Holland, University of Texas M.D. Anderson Cancer Center-Houston
 Steven Jacobsen, University of California, Los Angeles
 Neil Kelleher, University of Illinois at Urbana Champaign
 Bruce Lahn, The University of Chicago
 David R. Liu, Harvard University and Harvard School of Public Health
 Ruslan Medzhitov, Yale University
 Gero Miesenböck, Memorial Sloan-Kettering Cancer Center
 Sean Morrison, University of Michigan Medical School
 Indira Raman, Northwestern University
 Sharon Thompson-Schill, University of Pennsylvania
 Karsten Weis, University of California, Berkeley

2001 

 Steven E. Brenner, University of California, Berkeley
 Kenneth C. Catania, Vanderbilt University
 Michael J. Caterina, The Johns Hopkins University
 Joseph DeRisi, University of California, San Francisco
 Catherine L. Drennan, Massachusetts Institute of Technology
 Guowei Fang, Stanford University
 Elizabeth A. Finch, Emory University
 Su Guo, University of California, San Francisco
 Taekjip Ha, University of Illinois at Urbana Champaign
 Tonya L. Kuhl, University of California, Davis
 J. Troy Littleton, Massachusetts Institute of Technology
 Guangbin Luo, Case Western Reserve University
 Zachary F. Mainen, Cold Spring Harbor Laboratory
 W. Matthew Michael, Harvard University and Harvard School of Public Health
 Noam Sobel, University of California, Berkeley

2002 

 David Bilder, University of California, Berkeley
 Lera Boroditsky, Massachusetts Institute of Technology
 Brian R. Crane, Cornell University
 Hironori Funabiki, The Rockefeller University
 Jay T. Groves, University of California, Berkeley
 Rustem F. Ismagilov, The University of Chicago
 Daniel L. Minor, University of California, San Francisco
 Victor Munoz, University of Maryland, Medical School
 Axel Nohturfft, Harvard University and Harvard School of Public Health
 Bernardo L. Sabatini, Harvard University Medical School
 Ram Samudrala, University of Washington
 Peter R. Scheiffele, Columbia University
 Douglas Smith, University of California, San Diego
 Peter A. Takizawa, Yale University
 Jack Taunton, University of California, San Francisco

2003 

 Michael Brainard, University of California, San Francisco
 Jay Brenman, University of North Carolina
 Christopher Burge, Massachusetts Institute of Technology
 Anjen Chenn, Northwestern University
 Thomas R. Clandinin, Stanford University
 Luis Rene Garcia, Texas A&M University
 Barth D. Grant, Rutgers, The State University of New Jersey
 Chuan He, The University of Chicago
 Brian K. Kennedy, University of Washington
 Walther H. Mothes, Yale University
 Maho Niwa, University of California, San Diego
 F. Nina Papavasiliou, The Rockefeller University
 Stanislav Y. Shvartsman, Princeton University
 Milan N. Stojanovic, Columbia University
 Xiaowei Zhuang, Harvard University and Harvard School of Public Health

2004 

 Kaveh Ashrafi, University of California, San Francisco
 Matthew S. Bogyo, Stanford University
 Justin C. Crowley, Carnegie Mellon University
 Ricardo E. Dolmetsch, Stanford University
 Michael B. Elowitz, California Institute of Technology
 Kristina Hakansson, University of Michigan Medical School
 Reuben S. Harris, University of Minnesota
 Jeffrey D. Hartgerink, Rice University
 Grant J. Jensen, California Institute of Technology
 Youxing Jiang, University of Texas Southwestern Medical Center
 Brian A. Kuhlman, University of North Carolina
 Amy E. Pasquinelli, University of California, San Diego
 Jared P. Rutter, University of Utah
 Saba Valadkhan, Case Western Reserve University
 David P. Zenisek, Yale University

2005 

 Phil S. Baran, Scripps Research Institute
 Emily H. Y. Cheng, Washington University
 Aaron R. Dinner, The University of Chicago
 Nicole J. Francis, Harvard University and Harvard School of Public Health
 Eileen A. Hebets, University of California, Berkeley
 Melissa S. Jurica, University of California, Santa Cruz
 John D. MacMicking, Yale University
 Harmit Malik, Fred Hutchinson Cancer Research Center
 Wallace F. Marshall, University of California, San Francisco
 Kang Shen, Stanford University
 Toshiyasu Taniguchi, Fred Hutchinson Cancer Research Center
 Antoine M. van Oijen, Harvard University Medical School
 Jing Wang, University of California, San Diego
 Wade Winkler, University of Texas Southwestern Medical Center
 Li I. Zhang, University of Southern California

2006 

 Charles L. Asbury, University of Washington
 Elizabeth H. Chen, The Johns Hopkins University
 YiQin Gao, Texas A&M University
 Christy L. Haynes,University of Minnesota
 Jan T. Liphardt, University of California, Berkeley
 L. Charles Murtaugh, University of Utah
 John P. O'Doherty, California Institute of Technology
 Randen L. Patterson, The Pennsylvania State University
 Peter W. Reddien, Massachusetts Institute of Technology
 Kausik Si, Stowers Institute for Medical Research
 Eric P. Skaar, Vanderbilt University
 Angelike M. Stathopoulos, California Institute of Technology
 Lei Wang, Salk Institute for Biological Studies
 Stanislav S. Zakharenko, St. Jude Children's Research Hospital
 Jennifer A. Zallen, Memorial Sloan-Kettering Cancer Center

2007 

 Erin J. Adams, The University of Chicago
 Michael A. Beer, The Johns Hopkins University
 Julie Magarian Blander, Icahn School of Medicine at Mount Sinai
 Sean F. Brady, The Rockefeller University
 William M. Clemons, California Institute of Technology
 Or P. Gozani, Stanford University
 Wesley B. Grueber, Columbia University
 Christopher J. Lowe, Stanford University
 Sarkis K. Mazmanian, California Institute of Technology
 Dariush Mozaffarian, Harvard University and Harvard School of Public Health
 Gia K. Voeltz, University of Colorado
 Orion D. Weiner, University of California, San Francisco
 Sarah M. N. Woolley, Columbia University
 Joanna K. Wysocka, Stanford University
 Mark J. Zylka, University of North Carolina

2008 

 Emre Aksay, Cornell University
 Michael Axtell, The Pennsylvania State University
 Gill Bejerano, Stanford University
 Iain D. Couzin, Princeton University
 Lin He, University of California, Berkeley
 Morgan Huse, Memorial Sloan-Kettering Cancer Center
 Eric S. Huseby, University of Massachusetts Medical School
 Elizabeth A. Kensinger, Boston College
 Michael A. Lampson, University of Pennsylvania
 Tae-Hee Lee, The Pennsylvania State University
 Antonis Rokas, Vanderbilt University
 Alan Saghatelian, Harvard University and Harvard School of Public Health
 Tatyana O. Sharpee, Salk Institute for Biological Studies
 Douglas B. Weibel, University of Wisconsin - Madison
 Yukiko Yamashita, University of Michigan Medical School

2009 

 Philip H. Bradley, Fred Hutchinson Cancer Research Center
 Iain M. Cheeseman, Massachusetts Institute of Technology
 Danica Chen, University of California, Berkeley
 Mauro Costa-Mattioli, Baylor College of Medicine
 Bianxiao Cui, Stanford University
 Gregory S. Engel, The University of Chicago
 Nevan J. Krogan, University of California, San Francisco
 Andreas Martin, University of California, Berkeley
 Javier F. Medina, University of Pennsylvania
 John Novembre, University of California, Los Angeles
 Benjamin Ohlstein, Columbia University
 John L. Rinn, Harvard University Medical School
 Beth A. Shapiro, The Pennsylvania State University
 Doris Y. Tsao, California Institute of Technology
 Weiwei Zhong, Rice University

2010 

 Theodor Agapie, California Institute of Technology
 David Biron, The University of Chicago
 Sreekanth H. Chalasani, Salk Institute for Biological Studies
 Heather R. Christofk, University of California, Los Angeles
 Ila R. Fiete, The University of Texas at Austin
 Thomas Gregor, Princeton University
 Katherine A. Henzler-Wildman, Washington University
 Seth B. Herzon,Yale University
 Bo Huang, University of California, San Francisco
 Nelson C. Lau, Brandeis University
 David L. McLean, Northwestern University
 Maxence V. Nachury, Stanford University School of Medicine
 E. James Petersson, University of Pennsylvania
 Antonina I. Roll-Mecak, National Institutes of Health
 Emily R. Troemel, University of California, San Diego

2011 

 Alexei A. Aravin, California Institute of Technology
 Sandeep R. Datta, Harvard University Medical School
 Danica G. Fujimori, University of California, San Francisco
 Wendy S. Garrett, Harvard University and Harvard School of Public Health
 Richard E. Green, University of California, Santa Cruz
 Nicholas T. Ingolia, Carnegie Institution of Washington
 Megan C. King, Yale University
 Jared C. Lewis, The University of Chicago
 Attila Losonczy, Columbia University
 Luciano A. Marraffini, The Rockefeller University
 Elizabeth M. Nolan, Massachusetts Institute of Technology
 David J. Pagliarini, University of Wisconsin - Madison
 Patrick Seale, University of Pennsylvania
 Samuel Sidi, Icahn School of Medicine at Mount Sinai
 Joseph C. Sun, Memorial Sloan-Kettering Cancer Center

2012 

 Emily P. Balskus, Harvard University and Harvard School of Public Health
 Jesse D. Bloom, Fred Hutchinson Cancer Research Center
 Clifford P. Brangwynne, Princeton University
 Mark M. Churchland, Columbia University
 Elissa A. Hallem, University of California, Los Angeles
 Daniel J. Kronauer, The Rockefeller University
 Katja A. Lamia, Scripps Research Institute
 Gaby Maimon, The Rockefeller University
 Cristopher M. Niell, University of Oregon
 Daniel K. Nomura, University of California, Berkeley
 Daniel M. Rosenbaum, University of Texas Southwestern Medical Center
 Susumu Takahashi, University of Southern California
 David M. Tobin, Duke University
 Miguel A. Zaratiegui-Biurrun, Rutgers, The State University of New Jersey
 Feng Zhang, Massachusetts Institute of Technology

2013 

 Trever Bivona, University of California, San Francisco
 Jason M. Crawford, Yale University
 Danelle Devenport, Princeton University
 Guangbin Dong, The University of Texas at Austin
 Sophie Dumont, University of California, San Francisco
 Adam S. Frost, University of Utah
 Sunil P. Gandhi, University of California, Irvine
 Ethan C. Garner, Harvard University and Harvard School of Public Health
 Rana K. Gupta, University of Texas Southwestern Medical Center
 Christopher D. Harvey, Harvard University Medical School
 Brenton D. Hoffman, Duke University
 Christian M. Metallo, University of California, San Diego
 Mary Kristy Red-Horse, Stanford University
 Bozhi Tian, The University of Chicago
 Eduardo M. Torres, University of Massachusetts Medical School

2014 

 Janelle S. Ayres, Salk Institute for Biological Studies
 Brenda L. Bloodgood, University of California, San Diego
 Amie K. Boal, The Pennsylvania State University
 Irene A. Chen, University of California, Santa Barbara
 Kwanghun Chung, Massachusetts Institute of Technology
 Damon A. Clark, Yale University
 James S. Fraser, University of California, San Francisco
 Mitchell Guttman, California Institute of Technology
 Daniel F. Jarosz, Stanford University School of Medicine
 Gabriel C. Lander, Scripps Research Institute
 Kirk E. Lohmueller, University of California, Los Angeles
 Mohammad R. Seyedsayamdost, Princeton University
 Matthew Simon, Yale University
 Sarah A. Stanley, University of California, Berkeley
 Hani Zaher, Washington University

2015 

 Roberto Bonasio, University of Pennsylvania
 Kimberly Cooper, University of California, San Diego
 Lawrence David, Duke University
 Gül Dölen, The Johns Hopkins University
 Neil Ganem, Boston University
 Adam Hughes, University of Utah
 Jun Huh, University of Massachusetts Medical School
 Sriram Kosuri, University of California, Los Angeles
 Joel Kralj, University of Colorado
 Byungkook Lim, University of California, San Diego
 Yuki Oka, California Institute of Technology
 Kaoru Saijo, University of California, Berkeley
 Alex Shalek, Massachusetts Institute of Technology
 Duncan Smith, New York University
 Jing-Ke Weng, Whitehead Institute for Biomedical Research

2016 

 Alexis Battle, The Johns Hopkins University
 Kivanç Birsoy, The Rockefeller University
 Hernan Garcia, University of California, Berkeley
 Mike Henne, University of Texas Southwestern Medical Center
 Yevgenia Kozorovitskiy, Northwestern University
 Gene-Wei Li, Massachusetts Institute of Technology
 Carolyn McBride, Princeton University
 Sarah Slavoff, Yale University
 Gregory Sonnenberg, Cornell University
 Sabrina Spencer, University of Colorado
 Mansi Srivastava, Harvard University and Harvard School of Public Health
 Matthew Traxler, University of California, Berkeley
 Peter Turnbaugh, University of California, San Francisco
 Michael Yartsev, University of California, Berkeley
 Marija Zanic, Vanderbilt University

2017 

 Nicholas Arpaia, Columbia University
 Eiman Azim, Salk Institute for Biological Studies
 Alistair Boettiger, Stanford University
 Jingyi Fei, The University of Chicago
 Kendra Frederick, University of Texas Southwestern Medical Center
 Weizhe Hong, University of California, Los Angeles
 Todd Hyster, Princeton University
 Amy Si-Ying Lee, Brandeis University
 Nuo Li, Baylor College of Medicine
 Diana Libuda, University of Oregon
 Robert McGinty, University of North Carolina
 Jose Rodriguez, University of California, Los Angeles
 John Tuthill, University of Washington
 Gabriel Victora, The Rockefeller University
 Rebecca Voorhees, California Institute of Technology

2018 

 Andrés Bendesky, Columbia University
 Gira Bhabha, New York University
 Anne-Ruxandra Carvunis, University of Pittsburgh
 Lydia Finley, Memorial Sloan-Kettering Cancer Center
 Doeke R. Hekstra, Harvard University and Harvard School of Public Health
 Richard K. Hite, Memorial Sloan-Kettering Cancer Center
 Enfu Hui, University of California, San Diego
 Kate D. Meyer, Duke University
 Priya Rajasethupathy, The Rockefeller University
 Hesper Rego, Yale University
 Mark Sheffield, The University of Chicago
 Vincent S. Tagliabracci, University of Texas Southwestern Medical Center
 Jakob H. von Moltke, University of Washington
 Taia Wang, Stanford University
 Sarah E. Zanders, Stowers Institute for Medical Research

2019 

 Joshua Arribere, University of California, Santa Cruz
 Nicholas Bellono, Harvard University and Harvard School of Public Health
 Joseph Bondy-Denomy, University of California, San Francisco
 Jennifer Bridwell-Rabb, University of Michigan Medical School
 Paul Greer, University of Massachusetts Medical School
 Kelley Harris, University of Washington
 Wesley Legant, University of North Carolina
 Bluma Lesch, Yale University
 Maayan Levy, University of Pennsylvania
 Cressida Madigan, University of California, San Diego
 Ricardo Mallarino, Princeton University
 Aashish Manglik, University of California, San Francisco
 Andrew Miri, Northwestern University
 Caroline Runyan, University of Pittsburgh
 David Schneider, New York University

2020 

 Britt Adamson, Princeton University
 Lalit Beura, Brown University
 Hachung Chung, Columbia University
 Daria Esterhazy, The University of Chicago
 Mark A. Herzik, University of California, San Diego
 Hidehiko Inagaki, Max Planck Florida Institute for Neuroscience
 Sung Soo Kim, University of California, Santa Barbara
 Sangjin Kim, University of Illinois at Urbana Champaign
 Laura D. Lewis, Boston University
 Dipti Nayak, University of California, Berkeley
 Lisa Olshansky, University of Illinois at Urbana Champaign
 Lauren L. Orefice, Harvard University Medical School
 Upasna Sharma, University of California, Santa Cruz
 Amy E. Shyer, The Rockefeller University
 Xiao Wang, The Broad Institute of MIT and Harvard

See also

 List of biomedical science awards

References

External links
 Searle Scholars Program website

Biomedical awards
Fellowships
Awards established in 1980
Early career awards
Faculty awards